The National Monuments of Chile (Spanish: Monumentos Nacionales de Chile), also abbreviated MN, are the constructions, elements and places that form part of the country's cultural heritage, and they are protected by law. They are National Heritage Sites that are an important part of the culture of Chile.

Definition and categories 
The law N° 17.288 of national monuments stipulates that:

There are 938 national monuments as at October 2008. The monuments are grouped on the following categories: 
 Historic Monuments (633).
 Public Monuments (150).
 Archaeologic Monuments (21 elementos).
 Typical or Picturesque Zones (95).
 Sanctuaries of Nature (39).

Historic Monuments 
Are considered National Monuments:

In the register of the National Monuments Council, there are 633 elements (October 2008). Some of the most notable are:

Aduana de Antofagasta
 Ambassador (clipper)
 Ascensores de Valparaíso (Funicular railways of Valparaíso)
 Biblioteca Nacional de Chile
 Biblioteca de Santiago
 Bolsa de Comercio de Santiago
 Constitucion Talca Ramal
 Capilla del Antiguo Lazareto de San Vicente de Paul
 Capilla San Juan de Dios de Chillán
 Casino Ross
 Casa Lo Contador
 Castillo Wulff
 Central Hidroeléctrica Chivilingo
 Cerro Santa Lucía
 Escuela de Artes y Oficios
 Estación Central
 Estación Mapocho
 Estadio Nacional de Chile
 Iglesia de Nuestra Señora de las Mercedes
 Iglesias de Chiloé
 Iglesia San Francisco del Monte
 Londres 38
Monastery of the Holy Trinity (Las Condes)
Morro de Arica
Muelle Salitrero Compañía Melbourne Clark
Oficina Salitrera Chacabuco
Oficinas salitreras de Humberstone y Santa Laura
Palacio Cousiño
Palacio de La Moneda
Palacio Presidencial Cerro Castillo
Palacios en Santiago de Chile
Ruedas de Larmahue
Ruinas de la Fundición de Metales de Huanchaca
Templo Votivo de Maipú
Trolleybus system of Valparaíso
Valdivieso advertising sign
Villa Grimaldi

Public Monuments 
Public Monuments are all the objects used to perpetuate the memory on public places. The Law determines the Public Monuments as:

The National Monuments Council of Chile is trying to create a register in which all of the Public Monuments could be listed, using information from the local authorities. As of October 2008, there are 150 Public Monuments on the list.

 Hito al Trópico de Capricornio

Archaeologic Monuments 
Are considered Archaeologic Monuments:

In the National Monuments Council' register, at October 2008, there exists 21 Archaeologic Monuments. Some of the most notable ones are:

 Aldea de Tulor
 Pucará del cerro de La Compañia
 Quitor
 Sitio de Monte Verde

Typical or Picturesque Zones 
Are urban or rural properties, that forms a unity and are notable by their style, materiality or constructive technique. Legally, are considered Typical or Picturesque Zones:

In the National Monuments Council register, at October 2008, there are 95 typical zones. Some of the most notable are:

 Barrio Concha y Toro
 Barrio París-Londres
 Centro Histórico de Los Andes
 Campamento Sewell
 Humberstone
 Barrio Histórico de Iquique
 Paseo Atkinson
 Angelmó
 Pichilemu
 Valle del Elqui
 Ruta del Vino
 Cajón del Maipo
 El Mercado de Chillán
 La Recova de La Serena
 Túnel Cristo Redentor
 Viaducto del Malleco
 Andacollo
 Plazuela Marcelino Champagnat
 Centro histórico de la ciudad de Chanco

Sanctuaries of Nature 

Are considered Sanctuaries of Nature:

In the National Monuments Council there are 39 Sanctuaries of Nature.

See also 
 List of National Monuments of Chile by region

External links 
 Consejo de Monumentos Nacionales (Chile)

 
National Monuments
Chile
National Monuments